Desmond Thompson (4 December 1928 – July 2010) was an English professional footballer who played as a goalkeeper for York City, Burnley and Sheffield United. He was born in Southampton, the son of George Thompson, the Southampton goalkeeper.

His brother, George was also a professional goalkeeper, who played for Scunthorpe United, Preston North End, Manchester City and Carlisle United including playing for Preston on the losing side in the 1954 FA Cup Final.

References

Footballers from Southampton
English footballers
Association football goalkeepers
Burnley F.C. players
York City F.C. players
Sheffield United F.C. players
English Football League players
2010 deaths
1928 births